The Hurdy-Gurdy Player (French: Le Vielleur) is an oil-on-canvas painting by Georges de La Tour. The artist neither signed nor dated it, but it was produced in the first phase of his career, probably between 1620 and 1625. It is also known as The Hurdy-Gurdy Player in a Hat (Le Vielleur au chapeau) or The Hurdy-Gurdy Player with a Fly (Le Vielleur à la mouche). It is now in the Musée d'Arts de Nantes.

Description

The painting depicts an impoverished blind beggar singing in the street to the music of his hurdy-gurdy, an instrument traditionally associated with street singers. The hurdy-gurdy, portrayed in great detail in de la Tour's canvas, works by means of a hand turned wheel rubbing against a set of strings, whose pitch can be adjusted by hand operated wedges.

The beggar's distorted face and worn clothing are designed to invoke sympathy in the viewer for his situation. The existence of a fly on the singer's doublet (above his right knee) gives the work its alternative name and, in its proximity to such a beautiful instrument, can be interpreted as a comment on the fragility of life.

History, attribution and provenance
The first recorded mention of the work is in the collection of the Nantes-born diplomat François Cacault (1847–1805) at Clisson – a posthumous assessment of his collection on 6 November 1808 called the work "very capital", attributed it to Murillo and valued it at 6000 francs. The city collection bought it and it was hung in mayor Bertrand Geslin's office in the town hall, before being moved to its present home in 1830. From 1830 until 1903 the museum's catalogues noted it as a work by Murillo or the Spanish school. In 1836 Prosper Mérimée, then inspector general of France's historic monuments, admired the work during a trip to survey paintings in western France. 

From 1923 doubts about the attribution of the painting began to surface but it was not until 1934–35 that general acceptance of its authorship, primarily by comparison with other similar works by the artist, was achieved.

Other works on the same subject by Georges de La Tour

References

Bibliography (in French)
 Daniel Arasse, Le Détail : pour une histoire rapprochée de la peinture, Paris, Flammarion, 2008 (1re éd. 1992), 384 p., p. 128 & 214-215.
 Jean-Pierre Cuzin et Pierre Rosenberg (préf. Jacques Thuillier), Georges de La Tour : Paris, Galeries nationales du Grand Palais, 3 octobre 1997-26 janvier 1998, Paris, Réunion des musées nationaux et du Grand Palais des Champs-Élysées, 1997, 320 p., p. 136-139 (catalogue no 23, Le Vielleur, dit aussi Le Vielleur au chapeau ou Le Vielleur à la mouche).
 Jean-Pierre Cuzin and Dimitri Salmon, Georges de La Tour : histoire d'une redécouverte, Paris, Gallimard, Réunion des musées nationaux, coll. « Découvertes Gallimard / Arts » (no 329), 1997, 176 p..
 Pascal Quignard, Georges de La Tour, Paris, Éditions Galilée, 2005, p. 70.
 Pierre Rosenberg and Marina Mojana, Georges de La Tour : catalogue complet des peintures, Paris, Éditions Bordas, coll. « Fleurons de l'art », 1992, p. 44.
 Jacques Thuillier, Tout l'œuvre peint de Georges de La Tour, Paris, coll. « Les Classiques de l'Art », 1985, 2e éd. (1re éd. 1973), 104 p..
 Jacques Thuillier, Georges de La Tour, Paris, Flammarion, coll. « Les Grandes monographies », 2012 (1re éd. 1992), 318 p., p. 82-91, et « Catalogue des œuvres » no 20, p. 285.

External links
 
 

Paintings by Georges de La Tour
1620s paintings
Paintings in the collection of the Musée d'Arts de Nantes
Musical instruments in art